Up Close is a DVD by American pop singer Jesse McCartney. It was released on September 20, 2005 through Hollywood Records and features music videos, live performances and behind the scenes footage.

Features
Music videos
"Beautiful Soul"
"She's No You"
"Because You Live"
"Good Life"
"She's No You" (special performance video)

Live studio performances
 "Beautiful Soul" (Sessions @ AOL)
 "She's No You"  (Sessions @ AOL)
 "What's Your Name" (Taiwan TV)
 "Without You" (Taiwan TV)
 "Blackbird" (Stripped: Raw and Real)
 "Stupid Things" (Stripped: Raw and Real)

Behind the scenes
 "Beautiful Soul" (music video)
 "She's No You" (music video)
 "Get Your Shine On" (music video)
 On the Beautiful Soul Tour

In-depth interviews

Certifications

External links

Jesse McCartney video albums
2005 video albums
Live video albums
Music video compilation albums
2005 live albums
2005 compilation albums
Hollywood Records video albums